I'm Good may refer to:

"I'm Good" (Blaque song), by Blaque
"I'm Good" (Clipse song), by Clipse
"I'm Good", a song by Schoolboy Q on his album Setbacks (2011)
I'm Good (Abby Anderson EP) (2018)
I'm Good (Hahm Eun-jung EP) (2015)
I'm Good (album), a 2006 mixtape by rappers Yukmouth & Killa Klump

See also 
 "I'm Good (Blue)", song by David Guetta and Bebe Rexha